Joel Buchanan Danner (1804 – July 29, 1885) was a Democratic member of the U.S. House of Representatives from Pennsylvania.

Joel B. Danner was born in Liberty, Maryland.  He engaged in the hardware business and carriage building at Gettysburg, Pennsylvania.  He also served as justice of the peace.

Danner was elected as a Democrat to the Thirty-first Congress to fill the vacancy caused by the death of Henry Nes.  He resumed his former business pursuits in Gettysburg, where he died in 1885.  Interment in Evergreen Cemetery.

Sources

The Political Graveyard

1804 births
1885 deaths
People from Gettysburg, Pennsylvania
Burials at Evergreen Cemetery (Adams County, Pennsylvania)
Democratic Party members of the United States House of Representatives from Pennsylvania
19th-century American politicians